Anderson Everett Shumate (December 24, 1879 – October 3, 1947) was an American Democratic politician who served as a member of the Virginia House of Delegates and Virginia Senate.

References

External links

1879 births
1947 deaths
Virginia Democrats